No. 112 Air Surveillance Squadron is a squadron of the Sri Lanka Air Force operating in the reconnaissance role using unmanned aerial vehicles.  It currently operates the EMIT Blue Horizon 2 from SLAF Weerawila. Till 2008 the unit was an independent flight No. 11 "UAV" Flight, but was upgraded in 2007 to an operational squadron and split in 2008 to form the No. 111 Air Surveillance Squadron and the No. 112 Air Surveillance Squadron.

Aircraft operated
Year of introduction
 EMIT Blue Horizon 2 - 2006

References

External links
FORCE REPORT SRI LANKA AIR FORCE
scramble.nl

 Military units and formations established in 2008
112